Delphi is an unincorporated community in Thurston County, in the U.S. state of Washington. The community is located approximately west of Tumwater and Black Lake. The town of Littlerock lies to the south.

History
A post office was established at Delphi in 1892, and remained in operation until 1923. The name denotes "place of the Gods".

Parks and recreation
The Mima Mounds Natural Area Preserve, declared a National Natural Landmark, is south of the community. Delphi lies near the border of Capitol State Forest.

References

Unincorporated communities in Thurston County, Washington